Gheorghe Ene (also known as Gheorghe Ene II; 27 January 1937 – 6 April 2009) was a Romanian football striker and coach.

Club career
Gheorghe Ene was born on 27 January 1937 in București, Romania and started to play football in 1952, aged 14 at junior level at Progresul ICAS București, afterwards in 1954 he started his senior career at Voința București, moving after one season at Progresul CPCS București. On 18 March 1956 he made his Divizia A debut, playing for Rapid București in a 1–1 against Minerul Petroșani. During his four seasons spent with Giuleștenii, Ene became the top scorer of 1958–59 Divizia A with 17 goals scored. He went to play for Dinamo București where from 1962 until 1965 he helped the club win four consecutive Divizia A titles, in the first he contributed with 19 goals scored in 20 matches, in the second he played 19 games and scored 7 goals, in the third he made 14 appearances with 5 goals scored and in the last one he scored 15 goals in 23 matches. He also won the 1963–64 Cupa României with The Red Dogs and played in 11 European Cup matches in which he scored two goals in the 1965–66 edition against Denmark's champion, Boldklubben 1909 which helped the team advance to the next phase where they were eliminated by Inter Milan. Ene spent the last season of his career at Dinamo Bacău, making his last Divizia A appearance on 9 June 1968 in a 4–1 victory against Farul Constanța, having a total of 227 matches in which he scored 116 goals in the competition.

International career
Gheorghe Ene played three games at international level for Romania, making his debut under coach Gheorghe Popescu I on 15 June 1955 in a friendly which ended with a 4–1 loss against Sweden. His second game was a 1–1 against Yugoslavia at the 1958 World Cup qualifiers and his last appearance took part on 8 October 1961 in a friendly which ended with a 4–0 victory against Turkey.

Managerial career
Gheorghe Ene started coaching after he ended his playing career at Dinamo București's center of children and juniors, afterwards coaching senior teams Jiul Petroșani, Unirea Slobozia, Muscelul Câmpulung, CS Târgoviște and Corvinul Hunedoara, mostly in the Romanian lower leagues, having only short spells in Divizia A at Jiul and Corvinul.

Personal life
His brother, Daniel Ene was also a footballer who played for SC Bacău and Rapid București. Gheorghe Ene died on 6 April 2009 at age 72.

Honours

Club
Dinamo București
Divizia A: 1961–62, 1962–63, 1963–64, 1964–65
Cupa României: 1963–64

Individual
Divizia A top scorer: 1958–59

Notes

References

External links

1937 births
2009 deaths
Footballers from Bucharest
Romanian footballers
Romania international footballers
Liga I players
Liga II players
FC Dinamo București players
FC Rapid București players
FCM Bacău players
Association football forwards
Romanian football managers
CSM Jiul Petroșani managers
AFC Unirea Slobozia managers
FCM Târgoviște managers
CS Corvinul Hunedoara managers